Florence Lee (18641933) was an American silent era actress who appeared in over 90 films between 1911 and 1931. She is perhaps best known to modern audiences for her last film role, that of the blind girl's grandmother in Charlie Chaplin's City Lights (1931). She also appeared in some Our Gang movies during the 1920s.

Filmography

References

Bibliography

External links
 

1864 births
1933 deaths
American stage actresses
American film actresses
American silent film actresses
20th-century American actresses